Kherajkhat College, established in 1982, is a general degree college situated at Deotola, in Lakhimpur district, Assam. This college is affiliated with the Dibrugarh University.

Departments

Science
Physics
Mathematics
Chemistry
Botany
Zoology

Arts
Assamese
English
History
Education
Economics
Sociology
Political Science

References

External links
Official Website 
http://kherajkhatcollege.co.in

Universities and colleges in Assam
Colleges affiliated to Dibrugarh University
Educational institutions established in 1982
1982 establishments in Assam